Royal Air Force Glatton or more simply RAF Glatton is a former Royal Air Force station located  north of Huntingdon, Cambridgeshire, England.

History

United States Army Air Forces use
When completed in late 1943, the facility was placed under the jurisdiction of the Eighth Air Force, United States Army Air Forces.  Glatton was assigned USAAF designation Station 130.

USAAF Station Units assigned to RAF Glatton were:
 468th Sub-Depot
 18th Weather Squadron
 88th Station Complement Squadron
 1061st Military Police Company
 1212th Quartermaster Company
 1790th Ordnance Supply & Maintenance Company
 860th Chemical Company
 2100th Engineer Fire Fighting Platoon

457th Bombardment Group (Heavy)

The airfield was first used by the 457th Bombardment Group (Heavy), arriving from Wendover AAF, Utah on 21 January 1944. The 457th was assigned to the 94th Combat Bombardment Wing of the 1st Bombardment Division. Its tail code was Triangle U.

The 457th Bomb Group consisted of the following operational squadrons flying Boeing B-17 Flying Fortresses :
 748th Bombardment Squadron (Red propeller hubs)
 749th Bombardment Squadron (Blue propeller hubs) 
 750th Bombardment Squadron (White propeller hubs) 
 751st Bombardment Squadron (Yellow propeller hubs)

The 457th Bomb Group flew its first combat mission on 21 February 1944 during Big Week, taking part in the concentrated attacks of heavy bombers on the German aircraft industry. Until June 1944, the Group engaged primarily in bombardment of strategic targets, such as ball-bearing plants, aircraft factories, and oil refineries in Germany and Occupied Europe.

The Group bombed targets in Occupied France during the first week of June 1944 in preparation for the Normandy invasion, and attacked coastal defenses along the Cherbourg peninsula on D-Day in support of airborne forces who had landed on the peninsula. It struck airfields, railroads, fuel depots, and other interdictory targets behind the invasion beaches throughout the remainder of the month.

Beginning in July 1944, the 457th resumed bombardment of strategic objectives and engaged chiefly in such operations until April 1945. Sometimes flew support and interdictory missions, aiding the advance of ground forces during the Saint-Lô breakthrough in July 1944 and the landing of British 1st Airborne Division at Arnhem during the airborne attack on the Netherlands in September 1944; and participating in the Battle of the Bulge, December 1944 - January 1945, and the assault across the Rhine in March 1945.

The Group flew its last combat mission on 20 April 1945. The unit had carried out 237 missions. Total number of sorties was 7,086 with nearly 17,000 tons of bombs and 142 tons of leaflets being dropped.

After V-E Day, the 457th transported prisoners of war from Austria to France, and returned to Sioux Falls AAF, South Dakota during June 1945 and was inactivated on 18 August 1945.

RAF Bomber Command use
After the war, RAF Glatton was used by the RAF's No. 3 Group under the control of RAF Bomber Command using Avro Lancasters and Consolidated Liberators flying to the Middle East. It was closed and sold in 1948.

Current use

With the end of military control, Glatton airfield was largely returned to agriculture. However, parts of two runways have been retained and Glatton now operates as Peterborough Business Airport. All Saints Church Conington churchyard contains a memorial to the men of the 457th Bomb Group who lost their lives on missions that flew from Glatton.

See also

List of former Royal Air Force stations

References

Citations

Bibliography
 Freeman, Roger A. (1978) Airfields of the Eighth: Then and Now. After the Battle 
 Freeman, Roger A. (1991) The Mighty Eighth The Colour Record. Cassell & Co.

External links

 RAF Glatton Control Tower
 The 457th Bomb Group Association Website
 457th Bomb Group Association (older version)
 Diary Of A B-17 Ball Turret Gunner
 NATS - Modern airfield plan and details
 Mighty 8th Cross-Reference (Fred Preller): RAF Glatton
 USAAS-USAAC-USAAF-USAF Aircraft Serial Numbers--1908 to present
 RAF Glatton page on the Cambridge Military History Website

Airfields of the VIII Bomber Command in the United Kingdom
Royal Air Force stations in Huntingdonshire
Royal Air Force stations in Cambridgeshire
Royal Air Force stations of World War II in the United Kingdom